The 2012 WNBA season is the 5th season for the Atlanta Dream of the Women's National Basketball Association.

Transactions

WNBA Draft

Trades and Roster Changes

Roster
{| class="toccolours" style="font-size: 95%; width: 100%;"
|-
! colspan="2" style="background:#6495ED;color:white;"|2013 Atlanta Dream Roster
|- style="text-align:center; background-color:#FF0000; color:#FFFFFF;"
! Players !! Coaches
|-
| valign="top" |
{| class="sortable" style="background:transparent; margin:0px; width:100%;"
! Pos. !! # !! Nat. !! Name !! Ht. !! Wt. !! From
|-

Depth

Schedule

Preseason

|- align="center" bgcolor="bbffbb"
| 1 || Sat 5 || 2:00 || Tulsa ||  || 91-89 || Koehn (21) || Henry (9) || Harding (6) || Philips Arena  4,340 || 1-0
|-

Regular season

|- align="center" bgcolor="ffbbbb"
| 1 || Sat 19 || 7:00 || @ Indiana || SSOFS-I || 84-92 || McCoughtry (26) || Lyttle (10) || Harding (6) || Bankers Life Fieldhouse  9,403 || 0-1
|- align="center" bgcolor="bbffbb"
| 2 || Fri 25 || 7:30 || New York || SSO || 100-74 || McCoughtry (23) || Leuchanka (7) || McCoughtry (7) || Philips Arena  6,802 || 1-1
|- align="center" bgcolor="ffbbbb"
| 3 || Sun 27 || 3:00 || Indiana || SSO || 62-78 || McCoughtry (21) || Lyttle (9) || PriceSwanier (2) || Philips Arena  7,282 || 1-2
|- align="center" bgcolor="bbffbb"
| 4 || Thu 31 || 7:00 || Phoenix || SSO || 81-65 || KraayeveldLyttle (12) || Kraayeveld (9) || Price (6) || Philips Arena  4,887 || 2-2
|-

|- align="center" bgcolor="ffbbbb"
| 5 || Sat 2 || 7:00 || Chicago || SSOCN100 || 92-94(OT) || McCoughtry (33) || LyttlePriceSwanier (4) || Harding (6) || Philips Arena  4,503 || 2-3
|- align="center" bgcolor="ffbbbb"
| 6 || Tue 5 || 7:00 || @ New York ||  || 72-79 || McCoughtry (21) || McCoughtry (14) || Price (4) || Prudential Center  4,823 || 2-4
|- align="center" bgcolor="bbffbb"
| 7 || Fri 8 || 7:30 || San Antonio || SSO || 60-57 || McCoughtry (16) || Lyttle (9) || McCoughtry (5) || Philips Arena  4,501 || 3-4
|- align="center" bgcolor="ffbbbb"
| 8 || Sun 10 || 5:00 || @ Connecticut || CPTV-S || 73-92 || McCoughtry (23) || Lyttle (8) || Harding (5) || Mohegan Sun Arena  6,526 || 3-5
|- align="center" bgcolor="bbffbb"
| 9 || Fri 15 || 7:30 || Los Angeles || SSO || 92-59 || McCoughtry (31) || Henry (9) || Harding (6) || Philips Arena  8,872 || 4-5
|- align="center" bgcolor="ffbbbb"
| 10 || Sun 17 || 3:00 || Connecticut || SSO || 73-75 || Price (20) || Lyttle (9) || Price (6) || Philips Arena  4,323 || 4-6
|- align="center" bgcolor="ffbbbb"
| 11 || Tue 19 || 7:00 || New York || FS-S || 60-73 || HardingLyttle (13) || Lyttle (13) || Price (5) || Philips Arena  4,134 || 4-7
|- align="center" bgcolor="bbffbb"
| 12 || Sun 24 || 4:00 || @ New York || MSG || 74-64 || McCoughtry (23) || McCoughtry (8) || Swanier (9) || Prudential Center  6,754 || 5-7
|- align="center" bgcolor="bbffbb"
| 13 || Tue 26 || 12:00 || Indiana || SSO || 70-58 || McCoughtry (22) || Kraayeveld (10) || Harding (5) || Philips Arena  8,388 || 6-7
|- align="center" bgcolor="bbffbb"
| 14 || Fri 29 || 8:00 || @ Tulsa ||  || 102-92 || McCoughtry (24) || Lyttle (8) || Harding (7) || BOK Center  4,235 || 7-7
|-

|- align="center" bgcolor="ffbbbb"
| 15 || Sun 1 || 6:00 || @ Chicago || CN100 || 69-71 || McCoughtry (21) || Lyttle (7) || HardingHayes (3) || Allstate Arena  6,093 || 7-8
|- align="center" bgcolor="bbffbb"
| 16 || Sat 7 || 10:00 || @ Phoenix ||  || 100-93(2OT) || Lyttle (31) || Lyttle (10) || Swanier (5) || US Airways Center  7,948 || 8-8
|- align="center" bgcolor="ffbbbb"
| 17 || Sun 8 || 8:30 || @ Los Angeles || NBATVKDOC || 63-79 || Lyttle (17) || Henry (8) || Harding (5) || Staples Center  11,019 || 8-9
|- align="center" bgcolor="bbffbb"
| 18 || Wed 11 || 3:00 || @ Seattle ||  || 70-59 || Lyttle (21) || Hayes (8) || Harding (5) || KeyArena  9,686 || 9-9
|- align="center" bgcolor="ffbbbb"
| 19 || Fri 13 || 8:00 || @ San Antonio || SSOFS-SW || 70-91 || Lyttle (21) || Lyttle (12) || Harding (6) || AT&T Center  13,426 || 9-10
|-
| colspan="11" align="center" valign="middle" | Summer Olympic break
|-

|-
| colspan="11" align="center" valign="middle" | Summer Olympic break
|- align="center" bgcolor="bbffbb"
| 20 || Fri 17 || 8:30 || @ Chicago || CN100 || 82-76 || McCoughtry (25) || McCoughtry (8) || Lyttle (7) || Allstate Arena  5,593 || 10-10
|- align="center" bgcolor="ffbbbb"
| 21 || Sat 18 || 7:00 || @ Indiana || NBATVSSOFS-I || 72-86 || McCoughtry (22) || de SouzaPrice (6) || 3 players (2) || Bankers Life Fieldhouse  9,302 || 10-11
|- align="center" bgcolor="bbffbb"
| 22 || Wed 22 || 7:00 || Chicago || NBATVFS-SCN100 || 82-71 || Lyttle (24) || KraayveldLyttle (7) || HayesSwanierLyttle (5) || Philips Arena  4,010 || 11-11
|- align="center" bgcolor="bbffbb"
| 23 || Fri 24 || 7:00 || @ Washington || NBATVCSN-MA || 81-69 || Price (19) || de Souza (8) || HardingHayes (5) || Verizon Center  9,697 || 12-11
|- align="center" bgcolor="ffbbbb"
| 24 || Sat 25 || 7:00 || Minnesota || ESPN2 || 74-84 || LyttleMcCoughtry (14) || Lyttle (9)  ||  Harding (9) || Philips Arena  7,224 || 12-12
|- align="center" bgcolor="ffbbbb"
| 25 || Tue 28 || 7:00 || Tulsa || FS-S || 80-84  || de Souza 16 || de SouzaLyttle (9) || Harding (7) || Philips Arena  2,813 || 12-13
|- align="center" bgcolor="bbffbb"
| 26 || Thu 30 || 7:00 || Washington || SSO || 82-59 || de Souza (21) || de Souza (10) || Harding (5) || Philips Arena  3,381 || 13-13
|-

|- align="center" bgcolor="bbffbb"
| 27 || Sun 2 || 3:00 || Connecticut || NBATVSSO || 87-80 || McCoughtry (24) || Lyttle (13) || LyttleHayesHarding (4) || Philips Arena  5,020 || 14-13
|- align="center" bgcolor="bbffbb"
| 28 || Wed 5 || 7:00 || Indiana || NBATVFS-SFS-I || 71-64 || Harding (20) || Lyttle (12) || Harding (3) || Philips Arena  4,112 || 15-13
|- align="center" bgcolor="ffbbbb"
| 29 || Fri 7 || 8:00 || @ Minnesota || SSO || 93-97 || McCoughtry (30) || Lyttle (12) || Harding (7) || Target Center  9,308 || 15-14
|- align="center" bgcolor="bbffbb"
| 30 || Sun 9 || 3:00 || Washington || SSO || 93-68 || PriceHarding (15) || de Souza (10) || Harding (9) || Philips Arena  6,898 || 16-14
|- align="center" bgcolor="bbffbb"
| 31 || Tue 11 || 7:00 || Seattle || NBATVFS-S || 77-61 || McCoughtry (23) || de Souza (8) || HayesHarding (5) || Philips Arena  5,558 || 17-14
|- align="center" bgcolor="bbffbb"
| 32 || Fri 14 || 7:00 || @ Washington ||  || 82-74 || McCoughtry (26) || de Souza (8) || McCoughtry (8) || Verizon Center  7,368 || 18-14
|- align="center" bgcolor="bbffbb"
| 33 || Thu 20 || 8:00 || @ Chicago ||  || 75-66 || McCoughtry (21) || de Souza (10) || Harding (8) || Allstate Arena  4,188 || 19-14
|- align="center" bgcolor="ffbbbb"
| 34 || Sun 23 || 5:00 || @ Connecticut || CPTV-S || 72-92 || Harding (16) || Hayes (9) || McCoughtryHardingHayes (3) || Mohegan Sun Arena  9,143 || 19-15
|-

| All games are viewable on WNBA LiveAccess or ESPN3.com

Playoffs

|- align="center" bgcolor="bbffbb"
| 1 || September 28 || 7:00 || @ Indiana || ESPN2 || 75-66 || Harding (23) || LyttleMcCoughtry (9) || Harding (7) || Bankers Life Fieldhouse  7,776 || 1-0
|- align="center" bgcolor="ffbbbb"
| 2 || September 30 || 4:00 || Indiana || ESPN || 88-103 || McCoughtry (22) || de Souza (9) || Harding (6) || Philips Arena  6,890 || 1-1
|- align="center" bgcolor="ffbbbb"
| 3 || October 2 || 7:00 || @ Indiana || NBATV || 64-75 || Harding (17) || de SouzaHarding (7) || Price (4) || Bankers Life Fieldhouse  6,840 || 1-2
|-

Standings

Playoffs

Statistics

Regular Season

Playoffs

Awards and Honors

References

External links

Atlanta Dream seasons
Atlanta
Atlanta Dream